American rapper Lil Wayne has released 285 singles including 19 promotional singles. Lil Wayne attained his first singles chart entry in 1999 as a featured artist on Hot Boys member Juvenile's single "Back That Azz Up", which peaked at number 19 on the United States Billboard Hot 100 and became a top ten hit on the Hot R&B/Hip-Hop Songs and Hot Rap Songs charts. Wayne later released his debut solo studio album Tha Block Is Hot in November 1999. Its title track and lead single, which features B.G. and Juvenile, reached number 65 on the Billboard Hot 100. Lights Out followed in December 2000 and produced the singles "Get Off the Corner", "Everything" and "Shine". "Way of Life", the lead single from Wayne's third studio album 500 Degreez, peaked at number 71 on the Hot 100 and became a top 20 hit on the Hot Rap Songs chart. In 2004, Wayne was featured on the single "Soldier" by American girl group Destiny's Child, which became his first top ten hit on the Hot 100 and enjoyed commercial success internationally.

Lil Wayne's fourth studio album Tha Carter featured the single "Go D.J.", which gave Wayne his first top 20 hit on the Hot 100 as a lead artist and was later certified platinum by the Recording Industry Association of America (RIAA). Tha Carter II followed in December 2005 and produced the platinum-certified singles "Fireman" and "Hustler Musik", which peaked at numbers 32 and 87 respectively on the Hot 100. The album Like Father, Like Son, a collaboration with rapper Birdman, featured four singles – "Stuntin' Like My Daddy", "Leather So Soft", "Know What I'm Doin'" and "You Ain't Know" – all of which entered the Hot R&B/Hip-Hop Songs chart. Wayne's critically acclaimed and commercially successful album Tha Carter III, released in June 2008, produced several hit singles. "Lollipop" became Wayne's first number-one single on the Billboard Hot 100 and was certified Diamond by the RIAA. "A Milli", "Got Money", and "Mrs. Officer" all hit the top 20 on the Hot 100 and attained platinum certifications from the RIAA. Wayne's rap rock album Rebirth was released in early 2010 and featured four singles. During this period, he also guested on a number of top ten hits, including T-Pain's "Can't Believe It", Kevin Rudolf's "Let It Rock", Jay-Z and T.I.'s "Swagga like Us" and Jay Sean's "Down", the latter of which gave Wayne his second number-one single on the Hot 100.

Following a nine-month prison sentence for criminal possession of a weapon, Wayne returned to the music business with the release of the album I Am Not a Human Being in September 2010. "Right Above It", featuring Young Money Entertainment signee Drake, became a top ten hit. Released in September 2011, Wayne's ninth studio album Tha Carter IV featured the Hot 100 top ten hits "6 Foot 7 Foot", "How to Love" and "She Will". Lil Wayne broke American rock and roll singer Elvis Presley's record for the most entries on the Billboard Hot 100 in September 2012, with the debut of Game's "Celebration" – in which he is featured – bringing Wayne's total number of entries on the chart to 109. Wayne released his tenth studio album I Am Not a Human Being II in March 2013; "Love Me" was the most successful of the album's four singles, peaking at number nine on the Hot 100 and selling one million digital copies. The album received mixed reviews from music critics, criticizing Wayne's use of censored words. In 2014 he released the single "Believe Me" featuring Drake. The single was met with acclaim many ranking Wayne's verse to be one of the best of that year, the single certified platinum by the RIAA. Tha Carter V was delayed twice because of his problems with Cash Money. In 2015 he released his 11th studio album Free Weezy Album which was a Tidal exclusive and was not released for sale. The album was promoted by the single "Glory" and received positive reviews.

After many delays, his twelfth album Tha Carter V was released on September 28, 2018.

As lead artist

As featured artist

1999–2009

2010–2019

2020–present

Promotional singles

Other charted songs

Guest appearances

See also
 Lil Wayne albums discography
 Lil Wayne videography

Notes

References

External links
 Official website

 

Discographies of American artists
Hip hop discographies